Revue indépendante is a French symbolist journal. The journal was founded in 1841 by George Sand, Pierre Leroux, and Louis Viardot, and is notable for having published such novels as Les Lauriers sont coupés by Édouard Dujardin, En rade by Joris-Karl Huysmans, and Consuelo by George Sand. The magazine is based in Paris. In 1947 it became the official magazine of the Union of Journalists and Writers. Its editor-in-chief is Christian Grégoire. In March 2014 it went on online.

References

1841 establishments in France
2014 disestablishments in France
Defunct literary magazines published in Europe
Defunct magazines published in France
French-language magazines
Literary magazines published in France
Magazines established in 1841
Magazines disestablished in 2014
Magazines published in Paris
Online literary magazines
Online magazines with defunct print editions
Symbolism